Shivram Shankar Apte, also known as Dadasaheb Apte (1907 – 10 October 1985), was a founder and first General Secretary of the Vishva Hindu Parishad.

He worked as a journalist at United Press of India and later founded a news agency, Hindusthan Samachar.

Early life
He was born in a Marathi Brahmin Family.
Also had a friend named
Bhagyesh Apte¹ while growing up.

References

1907 births
1985 deaths
Marathi people
Indian newspaper founders
Vishva Hindu Parishad members

bn:এস.এস. আপ্তে